Mystic BBS is a bulletin board system software program that began in 1995 and was first released to the public in December 1997 for MS-DOS.  It has been ported to Microsoft Windows, OS/2, OS X, and Linux (Intel and ARM based systems such as the Raspberry Pi).  Mystic was designed to be a spiritual successor to the Renegade (BBS) and Telegard bulletin board systems.

Some of the more notable capabilities of Mystic BBS include:
 Integrated Telnet, SSH, RLogin, FTP, BinkP, HTTP, NNTP, POP3, SMTP servers with IPv4 + IPv6 support
 Full 5D compliant FidoNet BSO mailer and tosser, including BINKP & FTP mailers
 Built in AreaFix and FileFix functionality and full fileecho support
 Integrated QWK and QWKE networking via FTP
 Integrated text and ANSI editors, message editing with on-the-fly spell checking and word suggestions
 Proprietary scripting language called Mystic Programming Language (MPL)
 Embedded PYTHON 2.x and 3.x programming languages
 DOS CP437 and UTF8 character translations, terminal sizes up to 160x60
 Dynamic menus including menu editor, and fully customizable prompts
 Multiple user-selectable themes
 DOOR32 support in addition to various DOS-type door formats
 A fully featured ACS (access control system) and MCI display codes
 Modern security features such as TLS v1.2+, 512-bit PBKDF2 password storage, and AES-256 encrypted Netmail
 Highly integrated with ANSI graphics including full screen editor, lightbar menus, lightbar file listings and message reading
 Advanced, feature-rich JAM message base system with QWK/QWKE offline mail
 Multiple platform distributions available including Windows, OS X, Linux and ARM Linux (Raspberry Pi, ODROID, etc.)

A more complete list of capabilities can be found at http://www.mysticbbs.com/features.html

Attracted to the flexibility and potential that the scripting language provides, a number groups, such as ACiDic BBS modding, Cyberia, Demonic, DoRE, Vanguard, wOE!mODDING and Wicked formed for the sole purpose of writing BBS mods for SysOps who run Mystic.

External links

Software & Configuration 

 Mystic BBS Website
 Mystic BBS Wiki

Bulletin Board Systems 

Here's a small selection of BBS that currently use Mystic software (alphabetical by BBS name):

 [telnet]://terranempire.ddns.net:1017] (Emperor Kirk, your sysop, Mirror universe of Enterprise, Vintage computer theme)
 Agency BBS (New Zealand BBS, run by Avon since '13)
 Another F-ing BBS (Anotherbbs.bbsindex.com , Run by Gary Crunk since January '17)
 Arcadia BBS (Arcadia BBS, run by Nazferiti - Features Games, Files, and Gated Usenet)
 BlackICE BBS (German BBS, since '13)
 Captain's Quarters II BBS (CQII BBS website, running on a Mac!)
 Central Ontario Remote BBS
 Clutch BBS (Originally launched in '95 - home of the Acidic Paging Module)
 Cyberia BBS telnet to cyberia.darktech.org
 Datanet BBS Melbourne, Australia SysOp: rEApZ
 Distortion BBS
 Error 1202 BBS (Located in Perrysburg Ohio ran by Solaris since '19)
 Error 404 BBS (Located in Perrysburg Ohio ran by Solaris since '14)
 flupH BBS Survnet *Survival & Self reliance Hq* Blocktronic member board
 iNK tWO BBS Ink Two Website, run by Smooth since '13 in Covina, CA
 Leisure Time BBS (Located in New Baden, IL, USA)
 Necronomicon BBS (Originally started on Amiga CNet. Run by Necromaster. Home of RetroNet)
 Never Never Land BBS (419 area code oldest bbs since '89)
 Piranha BBS (<ACiD> board run by caphood, since '95)
 Sinner's Haven II (Originally Created in '89 telegard, '92 OBV/2, recreated in '13 under Mystic) 
 The Vortex BBS 864s longest running BBS created in 1996.
 THE VOiD BBS (Located in Troy, Ohio ran by Terra-X)
 Lunatic Fringe (Located in Vancouver, WA)
 The Zone BBS (Located in Lorain, Ohio)
 The ByteXchange BBS  - Texas - Home of Cyber-Net Network and running since 1992!
 SLiME CiTY BBS  - Sweden - Dedicated to retro computing and computer security! Running since 2013

To connect to these systems, a Telnet client designed to access BBS systems such as NetRunner is recommended.

Bulletin board system software